Photo response non-uniformity, pixel response non-uniformity, or PRNU, is a form of fixed-pattern noise related to digital image sensors, as used in cameras and optical instruments. Both CCD and CMOS sensors are two-dimensional arrays of photosensitive cells, each broadly corresponding to an image pixel. Due to the non-uniformity of image sensors, each cell responds with a different voltage level when illuminated with a uniform light source, and this leads to luminance inaccuracy at the pixel level.

High-end and metrology camera vendors tend to characterise this non-uniformity during instrument manufacture. The sensor is illuminated with a standardized light source and a two-dimensional table of correction factors is generated. This table is either carried in camera non-volatile memory and dynamically applied to the image on each capture, or ships with the camera to be applied by an external image processing and correcting pipeline.

See also 

 Color balance
 Color correction
 Flat-field correction
 Image sensor

Digital photography
Image sensors
Optics